The Alliance for Germany was an opposition coalition in East Germany. It was formed on 5 February 1990 in Berlin (then West Berlin) to stand in the East-German Volkskammer elections.

It consisted of the Christian Democratic Union (CDU), Democratic Awakening (DA) and the German Social Union (DSU). The German Forum Party was invited to join, but declined.

The Alliance won the most votes in the 1990 East German general election, winning 48.2% of votes cast (CDU 40.9%; DSU 6.3%; DA 0.9%), and would control 192 of 400 seats in the Volkskammer. It formed the government in East Germany until German Reunification. Lothar de Maizière from the CDU was minister-president.

See also 
 Alternative for Germany

References

https://www.britannica.com/event/Austro-German-Alliance

https://www.nationalarchives.gov.uk/education/greatwar/g2/backgroundcs1.htm

Heather Grabbe and Wolfgang Münchau (6/2/02) "Germany and Britain: an alliance of necessity" The Centre for European Reform and the Friedrich Ebert Stiftung

Defunct political party alliances in Germany
Peaceful Revolution
Organizations of the Revolutions of 1989
Political opposition organizations
Political parties in East Germany